Art-Rite was a cheaply produced newsprint art magazine that was published from 1973 to 1978. Located in downtown New York City, it was distributed freely there. Its editors were Mike (Walter) Robinson, Edit DeAk, and Joshua Cohn. Cohn dropped out of Art-Rite relatively early.

Formation and Trajectory
DeAk, Robinson, and Cohn met in 1972 in an art criticism class taught by Brian O'Doherty at Barnard College in New York. Based on this experience, the magazine took an agglomerative ground-level view of the art world. The editors often wrote anonymously, reflecting a collaborative process. Indeed, Art-Rite had a collaborative relationship with the art world (particularly with its own generation) and had a close relationship with the post-minimal and post-conceptual downtown art community that was in the process of moving away from formalism and towards an art of appropriation.

Art-Rite appeared irregularly; according to a subscription flier there were to be four to nine issues per year. Some appeared out of sequence and #16 was never published. The magazine ceased publication in 1978. A facsimile edition published in 2019 includes the complete collection of twenty issues of the underground arts magazine.

Covers
The magazine was famous for its covers, made by such artists as Alan Suicide, Carl Andre, Dorothea Rockburne, William Wegman, Christo, Vito Acconci, Pat Steir, Joseph Beuys, Judy Rifka, Robert Ryman, Rosemary Mayer, and Ed Ruscha.

References

External links 
 Interview about Art-Rite by Phong Bui in The Brooklyn Rail
 Art-Rite at New York Public Library

Visual arts magazines published in the United States
Magazines published in New York City
Magazines established in 1973
Magazines disestablished in 1978
English-language magazines
Defunct magazines published in the United States
Free magazines